Puchner is a surname. Notable people with the surname include: 

Eric Puchner, American novelist and short story writer
Joachim Puchner (born 1987), Austrian skier
Martin Puchner, German literary critic and philosopher
Mirjam Puchner (born 1992), Austrian skier
Walter Puchner (born 1947), Austrian writer
Willy Puchner (born 1952), Austrian photographer